is a Japanese manga artist, known for creating Oresama Teacher and Monthly Girls' Nozaki-kun. She began drawing manga in her first year of high school. She was soon selected to be in the top 10 of Hana to Yume Mangaka Course, and subsequently won the Big Challenge contest.

In an interview with Manga News in France, Tsubaki said that she was inspired from Yoshihiro Togashi and her sister who is also a manga artist. Yu Yu Hakusho was the first manga she bought on her own. She became a manga artist after placing third in a contest and was approached by an editor.

Works
Chijimete Distance (2002, Hana to Yume)
The Magic Touch (2003-2007, Hana to Yume, 9 volumes
Oresama Teacher (2007–2020, Hana to Yume, 29 volumes)
Monthly Girls' Nozaki-kun (2011–present, Gangan Online, 12 volumes)

References

External links
 

Living people
Manga artists from Saitama Prefecture
Year of birth missing (living people)
Women manga artists